Pish Deh (also Romanized as Pīsh Deh) is a village in Rud Pish Rural District, in the Central District of Fuman County, Gilan Province, Iran. At the 2006 census, its population was 272, in 70 families.

References 

Populated places in Fuman County